The  was a radical Japanese nationalist pan-Asianist organization founded in August 1919. Though the Rōsōkai was not explicitly pan-Asianist, or indeed political in its focus, its membership included many leading pan-Asianists and political commentators.

Dissatisfied with the overly non-political nature of the Rōsōkai, Ōkawa Shūmei and Mitsukawa Kametarō elected to form the Yūzonsha on 8 August 1919. This organization had a clear pan-Asianist reformist agenda, and included prominent members such as Kanokogi Kazunobu, Nunami Takeo, Kasagi Yoshiaki, Shimonaka Yasaburō, Kanauchi Ryōsuke, Ayakawa Takeji, Yasuoka Masahiro, Shimizu Kōnosuke, Iwata Fumio and Nishida Mitsugi.

Shortly after the formation of the society Mitsukawa and Ōkawa asked the radical pan-Asianist Kita Ikki, author of the quasi-totalitarian Kokka Kaizō Hōan Daikō (A Plan for National Reconstruction), to provide ideological leadership. Though he agreed to do so, moving to the organization's headquarters, he largely remained aloof from the organization; which did take on some of his ideology and was involved in illegally circulating copies of his banned work.

Though the Yūzonsha had plans to spread its radical pan-Asianist and nationalist message to university students, as a counter to the views espoused by Yoshino Sakuzō, it met with little success. The organization launched a monthly journal, Otakebi (War Cry) in August 1920, but published only three issues before ceasing publication; equally unsuccessful were its attempts to publish books, and only a few pamphlets were produced.

It was involved in a couple of political campaigns, notably a successful one to prevent the annulment of Hirohito's engagement to Princess Kuni Nagako, and an unsuccessful campaign to prevent his 1921 tour of Europe. The group eventually dissolved in 1923, alongside the Rōsōkai after disagreements between Kita and Ōkawa, particularly over Russo-Japanese relations.

References

Sources 
 

Japanese nationalism
Organizations established in 1919